William Ernest Tummon (6 February 1879 – 14 December 1960) was a Conservative member of the House of Commons of Canada. He was born in Huntingdon Township, Ontario in Hastings County and became a contractor and farmer.

Tummon attended public and secondary school in Hastings County. He was a councillor at Huntington Township for 14 years and a reeve there for five years.

He was first elected to Parliament at the Hastings South riding in the 1925 general election then re-elected in 1926 and 1930. Tummon was defeated by John Charles Alexander Cameron of the Liberal party in the 1935 election.

References

External links
 

1879 births
1960 deaths
Canadian farmers
Conservative Party of Canada (1867–1942) MPs
Members of the House of Commons of Canada from Ontario
Ontario municipal councillors